John O'Connell may refer to:

Politicians
 John A. O'Connell (1939–2000), American politician, member of the California legislature
 John Matthew O'Connell (1872–1941), American politician, Congressman from Rhode Island
 John O'Connell (Dublin politician) (1927–2013), Irish Labour Party and Fianna Fáil politician
 John O'Connell (mayor) (1826–1909), American political figure, mayor of Marlborough, Massachusetts
 John O'Connell (MP) (1810–1858), Irish politician, son of nationalist leader Daniel O'Connell
 John J. O'Connell (politician), American attorney and politician from Washington

Sportspeople
 John O'Connell (catcher) (1904–1992), former baseball player, 1928–1929
 John O'Connell (footballer, born 1951) (1951–1989), Australian rules footballer for Carlton
 John O'Connell (footballer, born 1932), Australian rules footballer for Claremont and Geelong
 John O'Connell (second baseman) (1872–1908), former baseball player, 1891–1902
 John O'Connell (soccer) (fl. 1946–1988), American soccer player
 John O'Connell (Gaelic footballer), Gaelic footballer from County Laois
 Johnny O'Connell (born 1962), American race car driver

Others
 John J. O'Connell (police officer) (1884–1946), New York policeman
 John Joseph O'Connell (1894–1949), American federal judge
 John Robert O'Connell (1868–1943), Irish lawyer and businessman
 John O'Connell (director) (born 1959), American television soap opera director
 John O'Connell Bridge, a bridge crossing Sitka Channel in Sitka, Alaska, named for John W. O'Connell

See also
 Jack O'Connell (disambiguation)
 John Connell (disambiguation)